Anna Karenina is an opera in two acts by American composer David Carlson, based on the 1877 novel Anna Karenina by Leo Tolstoy, commissioned by Florida Grand Opera to celebrate the 2007 opening of the Ziff Ballet Opera House at the Adrienne Arsht Center for the Performing Arts, co-commissioned by Opera Theatre of Saint Louis. The libretto is by British director Colin Graham, originally contemplated for Benjamin Britten's opera commissioned by the Bolshoi Theatre (the project was cancelled by the British after the Warsaw Pact invasion of Czechoslovakia). Graham was to have directed the original production; after his death only weeks before the opera's opening night, the direction was taken over by Mark Streshinsky. The opera is in two acts with a prologue and an epilogue, lasting just over two hours.

The composer added a new scene to the score for the West Coast premiere at the Opera San José in 2010.

Orchestration
The opera exists in two orchestral versions. The original calls for piccolo, 2 flutes, 2 oboes (both doubling English horn), 2 clarinets, 2 bassoons (#2 doubling on contrabassoon), 4 horns, 3 trumpets, 3 trombones, tuba, timpani, three percussionists, harp, celesta, and strings, with off-stage and recorded sounds.

The new version, created for Opera San José in California, re-scored by conductor Bryan Nies, is scored for 2 flutes (#2 doubling on piccolo), 2 oboes, 2 clarinets, 2 bassoons, 4 horns, 2 trumpets, 2 trombones, two percussionists, harp, synthesizer/celesta, and strings.

Recordings
The opera was recorded during the performances by Opera Theatre of Saint Louis, with the Saint Louis Symphony Orchestra performing, led by Stewart Robertson, and was released on the Signum Classics label.

Performance history and roles

Various spoken roles

The opera is published by Carl Fischer Music, New York.

References 

2007 operas
Operas
English-language operas
Operas by David Carlson
Operas based on novels
Operas based on works by Leo Tolstoy
Operas set in Russia